NBFA can refer to:

 National Benevolent Fund for the Aged, London-based charity
 National Black Farmers Association, for African American farmers in the United States
 National Business Forms Association, original name of Print Services & Distribution Association
 Newport Beach Firefighters Association, supporting Newport Beach Fire Department